Racism in Italy deals with the relationship between Italians and other populations of different ethnicities and/or nationalities which has existed throughout the country's history. 

These ideas, albeit already common in relation to the internal affairs of the country, were first directed outwardly when the Kingdom of Italy began invading and colonizing various African countries with the purpose to build a colonial empire between the late 19th and early 20th centuries, although policies regarding "miscegenated" children (meticci) were unclear and confusing. Under Benito Mussolini's Fascist regime (1922–1943) were enacted a set of anti-Semitic laws, as well as laws prohibiting internal migration under certain circumstances, shortly after the consolidation of the political and military alliance between Fascist Italy and Nazi Germany. In the aftermath of Mussolini's fall from power, the Badoglio government suppressed the Racial Laws in the Kingdom of Italy. They remained enforced and were made more severe in the territories ruled by the Italian Social Republic (1943–1945) until the end of the Second World War.

The post-war migration from Southern Italy towards the more industrialized Northern regions engendered a degree of diffidence across the Italian social strata. A successive wave of immigration by extracomunitari (non-EU immigrants; the word has strong undertones of rejection) from the late 1980s, gave rise to political movements, like the Northern League, hostile to both the so-called terroni (an Italian slur against southern Italians, whose presence in the North is regarded by party members as analogous to that of aliens from North Africa) and clandestini (illegal immigrants: this word also has a strongly negative connotation of secrecy and criminal behavior) from outside of Western Europe and the areas south of the Mediterranean.

In 2011, a report by Human Rights Watch pointed to growing indications of a rise in xenophobia within the Italian society. A 2017 Pew Research Center survey indicated Italy as the most racist country in western Europe. A 2019 survey by Sgw revealed that 55% of the Italian interviewees justified the perpetration of racist acts. On the occasion of a European Parliament resolution to condemn structural racism and racially motivated violence in 2020, around half of the Italian members voted against it. According to a 2020 YouGov opinion polling, the Italian interviewees claimed that the second most common cause of discrimination practiced in the country lie with racist prejudices. A 2020 Eurispes report revealed that 15.6% of Italians contend that the Holocaust never happened, and that 23.9% of the population adhere to the anti-Semitic conspiracy theories which claim that Jews control their economy.

Middle Ages
In Medieval Italy, slavery was widespread, but was justified more often on religious rather than racial grounds. Over the course of the Early Medieval period, however, Steven Epstein states that people "from regions like the Balkans, Sardinia, and across the Alps" were brought over to the peninsula by Italian merchants, who thus "replenished the stock of slaves". Still, almost all the slaves in Genoa belonged to non-European races; the situation was different in Venice and Palermo, where emancipated slaves were considered free citizens in the 13th century.

19th and early 20th centuries

Lombroso and scientific racism in Italy
Even though there was already a wealth of Italian works engaging in racially motivated research on some groups, like those pertaining to the "Oriental" character of ethnic Sardinians living under Savoyard rule, or their supposedly malevolent and "degenerated" nature, scientific racism as a proper discipline began to impose itself at the national level only through the works of the criminologist Cesare Lombroso. Lombroso's theory of atavism compared the "white civilization" among the other races with the "primitive" or "savage" societies.

Lombroso would publish his thesis in the wake of the Italian unification, thus providing an explanation for the unrest developing immediately thereafter in the recently annexed portion of the new country; the people inhabiting the formerly Bourbon Kingdom were in fact racially stereotyped, thereby fostering feelings of Northern Italian supremacy over the Southeners, while being paradoxically integrated in the nation's broad collective imaginary; As the Southeners were collectively constructed for the first time as an "anti-nation" within the new country, they were deemed "atavistic" alongside criminals and prostitutes.

Lombroso's theories connecting physiognomy to criminal behavior explicitly blamed higher homicide rates in Calabria, Sicily, and once again the overseas Savoyard dominion of Sardinia, upon some residual influence of "Negroid" and "Mongoloid" blood amongst their populations. According to Lombroso, facial features like black hair, slight beard, bigger lips and longer nose were signs of such foreign "contamination" and directly correlated with a natural predisposition to delinquency.

In 1871, Lombroso published "The White Man and the Man of Color", aimed at showing that the white man was superior in every respect to other races. Lombroso explicitly stated his belief in white supremacy: «It's a question of knowing if we whites, who haughtily tower over the summit of civilization, ought one day to bow down before the prognathous muzzle of the black, and the yellow, and to the frightful face of the Mongol; if, in the end, we owe our primacy to our biological organism or to the accidents of chance. (...) Only we whites have achieved the most perfect symmetry in the forms of the body [...] possess a true musical art [...] have proclaimed the freedom of the slave [...] have procured the liberty of thought». Lombroso proceeded again to equate the criminal offending of the white population to some inherited physical traits, pointing to a varying degree of residual "blackness".

Lombroso, who also wrote extensively on the topic of anti-Semitism in Europe and attacked anti-Semitic racial theory, distinguished between European Jews, whom he considered generally "Aryan", and traditionalist Jews whose religious practices he excoriated.

Other Italian anthropologists and sociologists also expanded on the theories previously set by Lombroso. The anthropologist Alfredo Niceforo, himself a Southener and more specifically a Sicilian, followed Lombroso's physiognomical approach, and postulated that certain ethnic groups were genetically predisposed to commit heinous crimes. The people Niceforo made initially reference to were originally the Sardinians; according to Niceforo, the reason as to why criminal behaviour was so entrenched in inner Sardinia firmly lay in the racial inferiority of the native Sardinian population, more specifically stating that it was due to latter's historical isolation and the resulting «quality of the race that populated those areas, a race absolutely lacking the plasticity which causes the social conscience to change and evolve».

However, Niceforo would later broaden the field of study to include also his Sicilian compatriots, as well as the whole population of the Mezzogiorno, in his theorisation of a particular "accursed race" that ought to be "treated equally with iron and fire and damned to death, like the inferior races of Africa and Australia". Alfredo Niceforo believed that Italy's regional divisions found their explanation in the fact that the country harboured two distinct races, the Alpine or "Aryan" in the North and the "Eurafrican" or Mediterranean in the South, and encouraged a statewide policy of race-mixing to properly civilize and dilute the most negative traits of the latter; the best example of such mixing, according to Niceforo, was historically provided by the Tuscans in central Italy. He also reasoned that the best course of action for Italy was to have it split into two different forms of government, which must be liberal in the North and authoritarian in the South. Dictatorship in the South would have to be applied by the central government, in line with the reasoning of the white man's burden that a "lesser" race would not be capable of self rule.

In 1906, Niceforo published a racial theory wherein blond pigmentation of hair and dark skin were both considered signs of foreign degeneration, while the "Italian race" was situated in a positive middle ground. Niceforo held these views as late as 1952, claiming that «Negroid and Mongoloid types were more frequent in the lower classes».

In 1907, the anthropologist Ridolfo Livi attempted to show that Mongolian facial features correlated with poorer populations. However, he maintained that the superiority of the "Italian race" was proven by its capability to positively assimilate other ethnic components.

The ideas expounded by Lombroso about race would enjoy a great deal of popularity in Italy, and would therefrom spread outward across the whole of Europe by the end of the 19th century.

Fascist Italy

Anti-Semitism before 1938

Jews fervently supported the Risorgimento, identified as Italian nationalists, proved valiant as soldiers in World War I, and, in terms of their relatively small numerical presence within the general population, they later went on to form a disproportionate part of the Fascist Party from its beginnings down to 1938.

It is still debated as to whether or not Italian Fascism was originally anti-Semitic. Mussolini originally distinguished his position from Hitler's fanatical racism while affirming that he himself was a Zionist. More broadly, he even proposed building a mosque in Rome as a sign that Italy was the Protector of Islam, a move blocked by a horrified Pope. German propagandists often derided what they called Italy's "Kosher Fascism".  There were however some Fascists, Roberto Farinacci and Giovanni Preziosi  being prime examples, who held fringe and extremely racist views before Fascist Italy formed its alliance with Nazi Germany. Preziosi was the first to publish an Italian edition of the Protocols of the Elders of Zion, in 1921, which was published almost simultaneously with a version issued by Umberto Benigni in supplements to Fede e Ragione.. However, the book had little impact until the mid-1930s.

It has also been indicated that Benito Mussolini had his own, if somewhat different from Nazism, brand of racist views.  Mussolini attempted to reconcile the divisive racial discourse which had developed within the nation by asserting that he had already resolved the Southern question and as a result, he asserted that all Italians, not just Northerners, belonged to the "dominant race" which was the Aryan race.

Mussolini originally held the view that a small contingent of Italian Jews had lived in Italy "since the days of the Kings of Rome" (a reference to the Bené Roma) and as a result, they should "remain undisturbed". One of Mussolini's mistresses, Margherita Sarfatti, was Jewish. There were even some Jews in the National Fascist Party, such as Ettore Ovazza who founded the Jewish Fascist paper La Nostra Bandiera in 1935. Mussolini once declared "Anti-Semitism does not exist in Italy... Italians of Jewish birth have shown themselves good citizens and they fought bravely in [World War I]."

Despite the presence of a Fascist regime, some Jewish refugees considered Italy a safe haven in the first half of the 1930s. During that period, the country hosted up to 11,000 persecuted Jews, including 2,806 Jews who were of German descent. However, as early as 1934, Jewish personnel were removed from institutions and state organizations. 1934 also saw press campaigns against anti-fascist Jews, in which they were equated with Zionists. Between 1936 and 1938, the Fascist regime-endorsed anti-Semitic propaganda was mounting in the press and it was even mounting in graffiti. Equally, scholars of eugenetics, statistics, anthropology and demographics began to outline racist theories.

Racial laws

In 1937, the Second Italo-Ethiopian War led to the implementation of the first Fascist Laws which promoted explicit racial discrimination. These were the laws against madamato – that is, the concubinage between Italians and African women in occupied territories. The penalty for madamato was from one to five years of prison. Remarkably, one of the justifications of the laws was that such relationships were abusive towards the women. In the occupied Eritrea women in fact took marriage by the traditional custom of dämòz, which was not legally recognized by the Italian state, thus relieving the husband from any legal obligation toward the woman. However, at the same time, a campaign against the putative dangers of miscegenation started in Italy. The Church endorsed the laws which stated the "hybrid unions" had to be forbidden because of "the wise, hygienic and socially moral reasons intended by the State": the "inconvenience of a marriage between a White and a Negro", plus the "increasing moral deficiencies in the character of the children".

In the late 1930s Benito Mussolini became a major ally of Nazi Germany, culminating in the Pact of Steel. The influence of Nazi ideology on Italian Fascism appeared in a 16 February 1938 press release by Mussolini in which some restrictions on Jewish people were suggested. An anti-Semitic press campaign intensified, with Jews blamed for high food prices and unemployment. The Fascist regime assumed an overt racist position with the Manifesto of Race, originally published as Il fascismo e i problemi della razza ("Fascism and the problems of race"), on 14 July 1938 in Il Giornale d'Italia. The Manifesto was then reprinted in August in the first issue of the scientific racist magazine La Difesa della Razza ("The Defense of Race"), endorsed by Mussolini and at the direction of Telesio Interlandi. On 5 August 1938 Mussolini issued another press release, this time acknowledging that restrictions on Jews were going to be enacted. The release noted that "segregating does not mean persecuting", but persecution had in fact begun.

The anti-Semitic metamorphosis of Fascism culminated in the racial laws of 18 September 1938. Although they did not directly threaten Jewish lives, these laws excluded Jews from public education, the military and the government, and they also made it practically impossible for them to engage in most economic activities. Jews could not hire non-Jews. Marriages between Jews and non-Jews were also prohibited.
 
Fascist racism also impacted French, German, and Slavic minorities, the most notable manifestations of it were the Italian Fascist government's attempts to fully Italianize the Balkans' territories that were annexed after World War I.

Second World War
During the Second World War, Italians engaged in ethnic cleansing. In the summer and autumn of 1942, as many as 65,000 Italian soldiers destroyed several areas of occupied Slovenia. Many areas were left almost depopulated after the killing and arrest of the residents. Between 1941 and the Grand Council's deposing of Benito Mussolini on 25 July 1943, 25,000 Slovenians (roughly 8% of the population in the Ljubljana area) were put in Italian detention camps.

In order to close Italian borders to all refugees and to expel illegal Jewish immigrants, Italian authorities complied with German requests to deport Jews in the occupied Balkans and French territories.

A pivotal event of the Jewish persecution in Italy during the war was the so-called razzia, or roundup of October 1943, in Rome. On the morning of 16 October 1943, German troops arrested as many as 1259 Jews for deportation to Nazi concentration camps. The Vatican, convents, monasteries and other Catholic homes and institutions had taken pre-emptive actions days prior to hide Jews, resulting in over four thousand escaping deportation.

Mussolini also played upon long-standing racist attitudes against Sicilians, enacting a number of laws and measures directed at anyone born in Sicily/of Sicilian descent. Regarding the treatment of Sicilians under Mussolini's regime, Count Ciano, Mussolini's son-in-law, wrote in his diaries on 4 October 1941: "The internal situation - coming apart in various places - is becoming grave in Sicily...So, then is it worse to be Sicilian than to be Jewish?"

Julius Evola

Julius Evola was a prominent intellectual during World War II as well as during the post-war period, and was the main Italian theoretician of racism during the 20th century. Evola published two systematic works on racism, including The Blood Myth (1937) and Synthesis of the Doctrine of Race (1941). Furthermore, Evola discussed the subject in a substantial number of articles in several Italian journals and magazines. Evola also introduced the 1937 edition of the Protocols of the Elders of Zion, published by Giovanni Preziosi. Evola wrote:

While The Blood Myth aimed at being an impartial review of the history and latest developments of racism theories in Europe, Synthesis of the Doctrine of the Race introduced the concept of spiritual racism. This concept met with the approval of Benito Mussolini. Mussolini was looking for a theoretical justification of racism different from that of biological racism, which was mainstream in Nazi Germany. Evola's brought together several underlying themes of her thought. Among those themes were anti-Darwinism, anti-materialism and anti-reductionism. Anti-Darwinism is the concept of history as regressive, positioning the apex of civilization at the beginning of history. For Evola, race existed on three levels: body race, soul race and spiritual race. The concept was pinned to a transcendent foundation. Evola wrote: "[r]ace and caste exist in the spirit before manifesting themselves in the earthly existence. The difference comes from the top, what refers to it on earth is only a reflection, a symbol." Evola explicitly criticized the Nazi racist view, deeming them "trivial darwinism" or "divinified biologism". For Evola, the Jewish race was not meant to be discriminated for mere biological reasons. In fact, Jewishness was essentially instead a "race of the soul, an unmistakable and hereditary style of action and attitude to life." Evola's spiritual racism was more powerful than biological racism, because it also recognized Jewishness as a spiritual and cultural component which tainted what Evola recognized as the Aryan race. Despite this peculiar theoretical elaboration, Evola's overall description of Jewishness was not particularly different from the common racist stereotypes of this period.

21st century

Anti-Roma racism

Anti-Roma sentiment exists in Italy, and it consists of hostility, prejudice, discrimination or racism which is directed against the Roma people (Gypsies or "Zingari"). There is no reliable data regarding the total number of Roma people who live in Italy, but estimates put it between 140,000 and 170,000.

In Italy in 2007 and 2008, many national and local political leaders engaged in rhetoric which stated that the extraordinary rise in crime at the time was mainly due to the uncontrolled immigration of people of Roma origin from Romania which had recently become a European Union member state. National and local leaders announced their plans to expel Roma from settlements which were located both in and around major cities as well as their plans to deport illegal immigrants. In May 2007, the mayors of Rome and Milan signed "Security Pacts" which "envisaged the forcible eviction of up to 10,000 Romani people."

In October 2007, an extraordinarily high level of anti-immigrant sentiment exploded into violence which was generally directed against Romanian immigrants and specifically directed against Roma immigrants. The violence was triggered by the murder of 47-year-old Giovanna Reggiani, a naval captain's wife, which was attributed to a Romanian immigrant of Roma origin. Reggiani was raped, beaten, left in a ditch, and died the following week. The Italian government responded by rounding up Romanian immigrants and summarily expelling some two hundred of them, mostly Roma, in defiance of E.U. immigration rules. According to the then Mayor of Rome Walter Veltroni, Romanians of Roma origin made up 75 percent of those who raped, stole and killed in the first seven months of the year.

The Greater Romania Party announced on 8 November 2007 that it would withdraw its five members from the Identity, Tradition, Sovereignty political group on 12 November 2007 over comments made by Alessandra Mussolini regarding the expulsion of Romanian criminals from Italy in early November 2007, thus dooming the European parliamentary group to falter less than a year after its creation. According to Romanian MEP and former ITS deputy chairman Eugen Mihaescu the final straw was the "unacceptable amalgam" Mussolini made between criminal gypsies and the entire Romanian population.

In May 2008, an unnamed 16-year-old Roma Romanian girl who was from a different part of town was arrested for trying to snatch an unattended six-month-old baby. After that mobs in several areas around Naples attacked Roma communities, setting homes alight, and forcing hundreds of Roma to flee. The camp in Ponticelli was set on fire each month between May and July 2008.
 
According to a May 2008 poll, 68% of Italians wanted to see all of the country's approximately 150,000 Gypsies, many of whom were Italian citizens, expelled. The survey, published as mobs in Naples burned down Gypsy camps that month, revealed that the majority also wanted all Gypsy camps in Italy to be demolished.

A 2015 poll conducted by Pew Research found that 86% of Italians have unfavourable views of Romani people. The 2019 poll of the same think tank found that still 83% of Italians have negative views of Romani people, the highest percentage of European countries surveyed.

In June 18 2018, Minister of the Interior Matteo Salvini announced the government would conduct a census of Romani people in Italy for the purpose of deporting all who are not in the country legally. However this measure was criticized as unconstitutional and was opposed by all the oppositions and also by some members of the M5S.

Anti-Sicilian and anti-Southern Italian racism 
In recent decades, there have been a handful of examples of anti-Sicilian and anti-Southern Italian racism in Northern Italy. Sicilians and Southern Italians who have moved to more northern parts of the country may face discrimination due to their sociocultural background.

Racism in politics and sports

Actions by the Lega Nord have been criticized as xenophobic or racist by several sources. Italians protested the murder of Burkina Faso native, Abdul Salam Guibre, along with racism in Italy on 20 September 2008.
L'Osservatore Romano, the semi-official newspaper for the Holy See, indicated that racism played an important role in the riot in Rosarno. According to a Eurobarometer study, Italians had the third lowest level of "comfort with person of Gypsy origin as neighbour", after Austrians and Czechs.

Contemporary Italian football fans, of lower-league and top-flight teams, have been noted by foreign media for racist behaviour.

Following the 2013 nomination of Cécile Kyenge, a Congolese-born Italian immigrant, as Minister of Integration in the government of Enrico Letta, she became subject to several racial slurs by local and national politicians. One of these slurs was made by Roberto Calderoli, a prominent figure of the anti-immigration and populist party Lega Nord. Calderoli claimed that whenever he saw Minister Kyenge, an orangutan came to his mind. During a speech by Kyenge at a meeting of the Democratic Party a few days after Calderoli's slur, some members of the far-right and neo-fascist New Force threw a clump of bananas at the minister.

Another example is the packages containing a pig's head that were sent to Rome's Synagogue, the Israeli embassy and a museum showing an exhibition on the Holocaust in January 2014.

Racist attacks, shootings and murders from 2018 onward 

 Macerata shooting, Marche: On 3 February 2018, a 28-year-old Italian, Luca Traini, performed a terror attack by severely injuring six migrants from Sub-Saharan Africa in a drive-by shooting incident that was described as an act of revenge motivated by the Murder of Pamela Mastropietro. The suspect was later arrested while wearing the Flag of Italy draped over his shoulders near a WW2 memorial in Macerata. Traini was described as a far-right political sympathizer who ran for the League and was reported to be supposedly acquainted with Mastropietro.
 San Calogero, Calabria. During the evening on 2 June, in the province of Vibo Valentia, a 29-year-old trade unionist from Mali, Soumayla Sacko, died of a shot in the temple. The attack may have been actually ordered by the local mafia group on the ground of the man's political activism.
 Caserta, Campania, 11 June 2018. Two Malian men were attacked by a few people with air guns from a car and got shot. According to the victims, the aggressors were heard singing in praise the Interior minister Matteo Salvini.
 Naples, Campania, 20 June 2018. Konate, a young Malian immigrant, was injured by a few people shooting him in the belly with a pellet gun while returning home after his work at a restaurant.
 Forlì, Emilia-Romagna, 5 July 2018. An Ivorian man was injured by air gun shots from a running car.
 Latina, Lazio, 11 July 2018. Two African migrants got shot at a bus stop, again from a running car.
 Rome, Lazio, 17 July 2018. A Roma child was wounded after being shot with an air gun. Some days later, the shooter was found and justified himself on the score of  “doing some training with the new gun, without intention of shooting anyone”.
 Vicenza, Veneto, 26 July 2018. An Italian man shot a builder from Cabo Verde who was working across the street. He justified himself stating that he was “just taking aim at a pigeon”.
 Partinico Sicily. A migrant from Senegal got beaten up by some Italian men that were yelling “Go back to your country, dirty nigger”.
 Roseto, Abruzzo, 30 July 2018. An Italian-Senegalese man tried to renew his health card at a local hospital. Upon seeing him, a public employee refused to offer him service, going on to suggest that he'd better find more luck in a veterinary office.
 Pistoia, Tuscany, 2 August 2018. An immigrant of unknown nationality was assaulted by two men that were shouting racist comments against him.
 Falerna, Calabria, 14 August 2018. A Dominican citizen was assaulted and injured by a group of assailants that shouted racist comments against him. His Italian mother-in-law was also beaten.
 Partinico, Sicily, 14 August 2018. Four Gambians and an Ivorian citizen were beaten and assaulted by several attackers for racist motives.
 Mestre, Veneto, 19 January 2020. A 19-year-old student of Chinese descent was publicly spat on by a group of teenagers, who hurled insults at her and told her to "go back to her country".
 Colleferro, Lazio: 6 September 2020. A 21-year-old cook from Cape Verde, Willy Duarte Monteiro, was killed by a group of MMA students who had sympathies for the alt-right. The public outrage caused by this murder, had convinced the government to accelerate the process of increasing safety precautions in the Italian urban centres, causing updates to the Daspo Urbano (an order similar to Antisocial Behaviours and Criminal Behaviours Orders in the United Kingdom) legislation, which was nicknamed "Daspo Willy", in memory of the deceased youngster.

Environmental racism

Notes

References

External links
Report of the UN Special Rapporteur on Contemporary forms of racism, racial discrimination, xenophobia and related intolerance on his visit to Italy 2007
CERD Concluding observations on Italy, 2008
European Commission against Racism and Intolerance — 3rd report on Lithuania, 2006

 
Italy